Ken La Grange (21 April 1923 – 25 June 2001) was a South African boxer. He competed in the men's middleweight event at the 1948 Summer Olympics.

References

1923 births
2001 deaths
South African male boxers
Olympic boxers of South Africa
Boxers at the 1948 Summer Olympics
Sportspeople from Germiston
Middleweight boxers